Daniel Taylor (9 January 1887 – 24 January 1957) was a South African cricketer who played in two Test matches in 1914.

A left-handed middle-order batsman, Dan Taylor was the older brother of the South African Test captain Herbie Taylor. He played in two Test matches under his brother during England's 1913–14 tour, scoring 36 in each innings of his first game, but failing in the other match.

Taylor had a spasmodic first-class cricket career, appearing in only 11 matches over a 12-year period, and playing regularly for Natal only in 1912–13 and just once the following season. He passed 50 runs in an innings only once in his career.

References

External links
 

1887 births
1957 deaths
South Africa Test cricketers
South African cricketers
KwaZulu-Natal cricketers